Maican Island (Ukrainian: Майкан, Romanian: Insula Maican) is a Ukrainian islet in the Danube.

See also 
 Snake Island (Black Sea)

References 

Islands of the Danube
River islands of Ukraine
Foreign relations of Romania
Foreign relations of Ukraine
Romania–Soviet Union relations
Landforms of Odesa Oblast
Romania–Ukraine border
Danube Delta